Karayayla is a village in Tarsus district of Mersin Province, Turkey. The village is slightly elevated with respect to the plains. The population of Karayayla  was 192  as of 2012. Main economic activity is agriculture and  grapes is the major crop of the village.

References

Villages in Tarsus District